United Nations Security Council resolution 525, adopted unanimously on 7 December 1982, after hearing of the death sentences on Anthony Tsotsobe, Johannes Shabangu and David Moise, the Council expressed its concern at the sentences passed by the Supreme Court of Appeal of South Africa, in addition to those of Ncimbithi Johnson Lubisi, Petrus Tsepo Mashigo and Naphtali Manana, members of the African National Congress.

The resolution called on the South African authorities to commute the sentences, and to all other Member States to use their influence to save the lives of the six men.

See also
 List of United Nations Security Council Resolutions 501 to 600 (1982–1987)
 Resolutions 503, 533 and 547
 Apartheid

External links
 
Text of the Resolution at undocs.org

 0525
 0525
December 1982 events
1982 in South Africa